The following is a list of people executed by the U.S. state of North Carolina since 1984.

There have been a total of 43 executions in North Carolina, under the current statute, since it was adopted in 1977. All of the people executed were convicted of murder. Of the 43 people executed, 42 were male and 1 was female. 41 were executed via lethal injection and 2 via gas chamber.

See also 
 Capital punishment in North Carolina
 Capital punishment in the United States

Notes 


References

External links 
 The Death Penalty. North Carolina Department of Correction.

 
North Carolina
People executed